Gwernydomen Halt railway station (sometimes spelt Gwern-y-Domen) was a small rural halt in South Wales, northeast from Caerphilly. It operated until 1956.

History and description
The halt was opened in 1908. It was a very basic affair, being without a platform, and consisting just of a fenced enclosure and a signboard, though did have the benefit of a single lamp. When the line was built through the location, an ancient motte was damaged by the building work.

The halt closed in 1956, when passenger services over the former Pontypridd, Caerphilly and Newport Railway were withdrawn. Little trace remains of it today, and the trackbed has been reclaimed by nature. By 1996, only a cleared area of trees and the abutments of a disused bridge marked the spot.

References

Disused railway stations in Caerphilly County Borough
Former Brecon and Merthyr Tydfil Junction Railway stations
Railway stations in Great Britain opened in 1908
Railway stations in Great Britain closed in 1956
1908 establishments in Wales
1956 disestablishments in Wales